Chandler High School is a public high school serving 303 students in grades nine through 12 located in Chandler, Oklahoma. The sports team nickname is the Lions. Notable alumni include baseball player Jon Gray. The school's address is 901 South CHS Street, Chandler, OK 74834.

School demographics
81% of the students are white, while 10% are Native American, 8% are black and less than 1% are Asian and Hispanic.

References

Public high schools in Oklahoma
Education in Lincoln County, Oklahoma
Chandler, Oklahoma